Chiké Okonkwo (born 18 March 1982) is a British actor. He is known for portraying PC Clark in New Tricks, DC Callum Gada in Paradox, Lee Truitt in Being Mary Jane, and Ty Coleman in La Brea.

Early life
Born and brought up in Kingston upon Thames, Okonkwo is of Nigerian descent. He attended Tolworth Infants/Juniors School and Southborough High School in Hook, and later turned down a number of places at the UK's leading drama schools in order to pursue a university education, gaining a First Class degree in Business Computing from the University of Surrey, graduating in 2003. After completing his studies Okonkwo pursued an acting career full-time.

Career
Okonkwo was one of ten actors selected from 12,000 applicants for the BBC Talent Scheme in 2001, leading to his first professional acting role in Holby City. He trained at the National Youth Theatre, and was a member of the National Youth Music Theatre between 1999 and 2002. Okonkwo is the patron of the Kingston-based International Youth Arts Festival.

Okonkwo's stage credits include Oklahoma!, Into the Woods, Fixer, As You Like It, In Time and A Matter of Life and Death. He spent a year performing at the National Theatre, where he appeared in several productions including Philip Pullman's His Dark Materials.

Okonkwo's film work includes Derailed (2005), Animal (2005) and Spirit Trap (2005). He has also appeared in the short films Tooting Broadway Flatmates and Knock Off.

On television, Okonkwo has made guest appearances in episodes of  Holby City, Silent Witness, Casualty, M.I.T.: Murder Investigation Team and Roman Mysteries. He also appeared in Blood and Oil, a BBC Two drama about the oil conflict in the Niger Delta. Okonkwo played the lead roles of PC Clark in the pilot and first series of New Tricks, and DC Callum Gada in Paradox.

Okonkwo is a long-standing member of the Royal Shakespeare Company (RSC) performing in their 50th Anniversary season in Stratford-Upon-Avon, and most recently in Gregory Doran's critically acclaimed production of Julius Caesar at the Brooklyn Academy of Music (BAM) in New York in 2013.

He co-starred in The Birth of a Nation, which premiered in competition at the Sundance Film Festival in 2016.

Filmography

Film

Television

Video games

References

External links

Archive.org of official website

1982 births
Living people
Alumni of the University of Surrey
Male actors from London
Royal Shakespeare Company members
Black British male actors
English male film actors
English male stage actors
English male television actors
English male voice actors
English people of Nigerian descent
National Youth Theatre members
People from Kingston upon Thames
21st-century English male actors